Heleophryne is a genus of ghost frogs. They are known from mountainous regions of South Africa, Lesotho, and Eswatini.

One member of the genus, the Table Mountain ghost frog (H. rosei) is considered an EDGE species.

Species
The following species are classified in this genus:
 Cederberg ghost frog (Heleophryne depressa) FitzSimons, 1946
 Hewitt's ghost frog (Heleophryne hewitti) Boycott, 1988
 Eastern ghost frog (Heleophryne orientalis) FitzSimons, 1946
 Purcell's ghost frog (Heleophryne purcelli) Sclater, 1898
 Royal ghost frog (Heleophryne regis) Hewitt, 1910
 Rose's ghost frog (Heleophryne rosei) Hewitt, 1925

References

 
Heleophrynoidea
Amphibian genera
Taxa named by Philip Sclater